Dvor ( or ) is a settlement in the Municipality of Šmarje pri Jelšah in eastern Slovenia. It lies on a small stream named Dvor Creek after the settlement itself northwest of Šmarje pri Jelšah. The area is part of the traditional region of Styria. The municipality is now included in the Savinja Statistical Region.

References

External links
Dvor at Geopedia

Populated places in the Municipality of Šmarje pri Jelšah